The Human Development Index is a United Nations measure of well-being in a country.

HDI may also refer to:
PSA HDi engine, a diesel automobile engine by Peugeot/Citroën
Hexamethylene diisocyanate, an organic compound used to make polymers such as polyurethane
HDi Interactive Format (formerly iHD), a trademark for Microsoft's implementation of advanced interactivity for HD DVD
Histone deacetylase inhibitor, compounds used in psychiatry and neurology, and with anticancer potential
HDI-30 connector, an external SCSI connector by Apple
HDI-45 connector, a video connector by Apple
Heroux-Devtek Inc., a manufacturer of aircraft undercarriages
Hdi language of Cameroon and Nigeria 
HDI-Arena, a sports stadium in Hanover, Germany
HDI (Help Desk Institute), a division of UBM Technology Group
Highest density interval, a method for choosing a credible interval in Bayesian statistics